Nancy A. Henry (born November 15, 1961) is an American Poet.

Background

Nancy Henry was born Chipley, Florida, in 1961 to J.F. and Nancy J. Henry, and spent her early years in Gainesville, Florida. She graduated with a bachelor's degree in political science from St. Andrews Presbyterian College in 1982.  She moved to Maine in 1983 to attend the University of Maine School of Law, from which she graduated with her JD degree in 1986.

Henry is editor and publisher of Cardinal Flower Journal, an online literary magazine featuring writing and photography of rural New England. She is a former adjunct instructor of English and Humanities at Central Maine Community College, University of Southern Maine, Thomas College, and Southern Maine Community College. From 1986 to 2007, she was a practicing attorney, working primarily in the area of child advocacy. Formerly, she has served as assistant attorney general of the state of Maine in the Department of Child Protection. She lives in Wenham, Massachusetts, with her husband, physicist Dr. Harold Persing. The couple have three grown children.

Published works

Henry is the author of three full-length collections of poetry: from Sheltering Pines Press, Our Lady of Let’s All Sing (2007), Who You Are (2008), and, from Moon Pie Press, "Sarx" (2010). She is co-founder, with Alice N. Persons, of Moon Pie Press, and served as co-editor from its founding until 2005.

Henry is also the author of two chapbooks from Musclehead Press, Anything Can Happen (2001) and Hard (2003); two chapbooks from Moon Pie Press, Eros Ion (2004) and Europe on $5 a Day (2005). Her first chapbook, Brie Fly, is now out-of-print.

Her work has been anthologized in Grace Notes (Sheltering Pines Press, 2002), Infini Tea (Sheltering Pines Press, 2004); Velvet Avalanche ([Satjah Projects], 2005);  Fierce With Reality (Just Write Books, 2006) , and A Sense of Place, (Bay River Press, 2002)  as well as the first Moon Pie Press anthology, A Moxie and a Moon Pie (2005 ). Henry's poems have been featured by Garrison Keillor on The Writer's Almanac.

She has been nominated four times for the Pushcart Prize, and has served as an associate editor of the literary journal The Café Review.

References

People from Westbrook, Maine
Writers from Gainesville, Florida
Living people
1961 births
Maine lawyers
Southern Maine Community College faculty
St. Andrews University (North Carolina) alumni
University of Maine School of Law alumni
American women poets
Poets from Florida
Central Maine Community College faculty
People from Wenham, Massachusetts
21st-century American poets
American women academics
21st-century American women writers